Thomas M. Calderon (born April 8, 1954) is an American Democratic politician from the state of California. He served in the California Assembly from 1998 through 2002.

In 2014, Calderon and his brother State Senator Ron Calderon were indicted for bribery. In early June 2016, Calderon pleaded guilty to money-laundering.

Calderon is from Montebello, California.

References

External links

Join California Tom Calderon

Living people
Tom
Democratic Party members of the California State Assembly
People from Montebello, California
American politicians of Mexican descent
Hispanic and Latino American state legislators in California
21st-century American politicians
1954 births